Ultima may refer to:

Places
 Ultima, Victoria, a town in Australia
 Pangaea Ultima, a supercontinent to occur in the future
 Ultima, the larger lobe of the trans-Neptunian object 486958 Arrokoth, nicknamed Ultima Thule

Companies and products
 Ultima Foods, a division of Quebec-based dairy company Agropur
 Ultima Sports Ltd, a manufacturer of sports cars based in England
 Junkers Profly Ultima, a German homebuilt aircraft design
 Kodak Ultima, a brand of photo paper for inkjet printers sold by Eastman Kodak
 Kyosho Ultima, a radio-controlled car made by Kyosho
 Nissan Altima, a model of car by Nissan
 Ultima GTR a 1990s Sportscar

Games
 Baroque chess, known in the northeastern region of the United States as "Ultima"
 Ultima (series), a series of video games
Ultima I, which was first released as Ultima
 Ultima (Final Fantasy), a recurring boss, weapon and spell in the Final Fantasy franchise
 Ultima (Freedom City), characters in Freedom City

Music
 Ultima Oslo Contemporary Music Festival
 Ultima Thulée, the first full-length studio album by black metal band Blut Aus Nord
 La Ultima / Live in Berlin (2005 album) German rock album by Böhse Onkelz

Other uses
 Ultima (linguistics), the last syllable of a word
 Ultima (finance), a variable in quantitative finance
 Bless Me, Ultima, a 1972 novel by Rudolfo Anaya with a character called Ultima
 Ultima Tower, a hypothetical supertall skyscraper

See also

 Ultima Thule (disambiguation)
 
 
 Ultimo (disambiguation), a similar term
 Ultimate (disambiguation)